Tommy Woods (9 February 1883 – 12 April 1955) was an English dual-code international rugby union, and professional rugby league footballer who played in the 1900s, 1910s and 1920s. He played representative level rugby union (RU) for England and Somersetshire, and at club level for Bridgwater & Albion RFC, as a forward, and representative level rugby league (RL) for Great Britain and England, and at club level for Rochdale Hornets, as a forward (prior to the specialist positions of), during the era of contested scrums.

Background
Tommy Woods was born in 1883 in Bridgwater, and later played rugby union for Bridgwater & Albion RFC, alongside Robert Dibble and Walter Roman.

Playing career

International honours
Tommy Woods won a cap for England (RU) while at Bridgwater & Albion RFC against Scotland at Inverleith on 21 March 1908, and won caps for England (RL) while at Rochdale Hornets in 1911 against Australia, in 1912 against Wales, in 1913 against Wales, and won caps for Great Britain while at Rochdale Hornets in 1911 against Australia, and in 1912 against Australia.

County honours
Tommy Woods represented Somersetshire (RU) while at Bridgwater & Albion RFC.

Challenge Cup Final appearances
Tommy Woods played as a forward, i.e. number 11, in Rochdale Hornets' 10–9 victory over Hull F.C. in the 1921–22 Challenge Cup Final during the 1921–22 season at Headingley Rugby Stadium, Leeds on Saturday 6 May 1922, in front of a crowd of 32,596.

County Cup Final appearances
Tommy Woods played as a forward, i.e. number 8, in Rochdale Hornets' 12–5 victory over Oldham in the 1911–12 Lancashire County Cup Final during the 1911–12 season at Wheater's Field, Broughton, Salford on Saturday 2 December 1911, in front of a crowd of 20,000.

References

1883 births
1955 deaths
Bridgwater & Albion RFC players
Dual-code rugby internationals
England international rugby union players
England national rugby league team players
English rugby league players
English rugby union players
Great Britain national rugby league team players
Rochdale Hornets players
Rugby league forwards
Rugby league players from Somerset
Rugby union forwards
Rugby union players from Bridgwater
Somerset County RFU players